Teresa Porzecanski (born 5 de May 1945) is an Uruguayan anthropologist, profesor and writer. 

From an Ashkenazi and Sephardic Jewish family (her father was originally from Libau and her mother from Syria), her works have included a focus on the Jewish communities of Uruguay, afrodescendant minorities, prejudice and ethnic issues. She has been is a professor at the Catholic University of Uruguay., Universidad de la Republica, CLAEH, and various universities in Argentina, Brazil, Perú, México, United States, Puerto Rico, Sweden, and Israel.

She grew up in Montevideo. From 1978-1981, she collected oral histories of Jewish immigrants which was published as Life Stories of Jewish Immigrants to Uruguay in its first edition in Spanish in 1986. In a review for the American Jewish Archives, Alejandro Lilienthal called it a good introduction to the subject, outside of the transcriptions of the oral histories.

Her fiction is part of a tradition of works exploring identities and migration maladjustments, prejudice against minorities, and women interior worlds.

In 1992, she received a Guggenheim Fellowship, during which she studied the Sephardim and rabbinic lore. She has also received a Fulbright scholarship. as well as a Rockefeller Residency Grant in Bellagio, Italy, to write her fiction. She received five awards by the Ministry of Education of Uruguay, two awards by the Municipality of Montevideo, the Critics Award Bartolomé Hidalgo (1995) and the Morosoli Award for Literature (2004).

Selected works

Fiction
1967, The Riddle and other stories (El acertijo y otros cuentos) 
1979, Constructions (Construcciones) 
1981, Sun Inventions (Invención de los soles)
1986, An Erotic Novel (Una novela erótica)
1989, Messiah in Montevideo (Mesías en Montevideo)
1989, Breath is a Forge (La respiración es una fragua) 
1994, Perfumes of Cartaghe (Perfumes de Cartago)
1996, The skin of the soul (La piel del alma) 
2002, Fleeting happiness (Felicidades fugaces)

Nonfiction
1986, Life Stories of Jewish Immigrants to Uruguay (La vida empezó acá : inmigrantes judíos al Uruguay : historias de vida y perspectiva antropológica de la conformación de la comunidad judía uruguaya, contrastes culturales y procesos de enculturación) (2nd ed, 2005)
2004,  (with Pablo Dabezies, Gerardo Caetano, and other authors).

References

1945 births
Living people
Uruguayan anthropologists
Uruguayan women anthropologists
20th-century Uruguayan women writers
Uruguayan Jews
Uruguayan people of Latvian-Jewish descent
Uruguayan people of Syrian-Jewish descent
Jewish anthropologists
Premio Bartolomé Hidalgo